Sandon is a village and civil parish in the North Hertfordshire district, in the county of Hertfordshire, England. Sandon is located near the towns of Baldock and Buntingford. The parish also includes the hamlets of Green End and Roe Green, and Blagrove Common, a nature reserve. At the 2011 Census the population of the civil parish was 495. 

Sandon has 47 listed buildings, including
one of Britain's estimated 200 medieval barns, the construction of which has been dendrochronologically dated to 1266–68.
All Saints Church.

The Icknield Way Path passes through the village on its  journey from Ivinghoe Beacon in Buckinghamshire to Knettishall Heath in Suffolk.

References

External links 
 Listed buildings in Sandon
 http://www.visionofbritain.org.uk/place/place_page.jsp?p_id=4390

Villages in Hertfordshire
Civil parishes in Hertfordshire
North Hertfordshire District